Manning Point is a small village located at the mouth of the Manning River in New South Wales, Australia . Lying on Mitchells Island, it lies opposite the town of Harrington. At the 2006 census, Manning Point had a population of 228.

It was previously known as Brighton.

Besides the holiday rental units, it has a general store, a bowling club, the two caravan parks, a cafe, and a bait shop. The general store is also the news agent, the video rental shop, the Australia Post Office, the bottle shop, the burger and fish and chips grill, and the grocery store.

The type collection of the jewel beetle species Maoraxia auroimpressa was collected at Manning Point.

References 

Mid North Coast
Suburbs of Mid-Coast Council
Coastal towns in New South Wales